Tarpon Bay or Tarpon Bayou may refer to any of several bays in Florida and South Carolina, named for the tarpon fish:

Tarpon Bay of Sanibel Island, Florida
Tarpon Bay of Marco Island, Florida
Tarpon Bays of the Everglades, Florida
Tarpon Bayou of Pinellas County, Florida
Tarpon Bay near Myrtle Beach, South Carolina